Pseudonocardia benzenivorans is a Gram-positive, rod-shaped, non-spore-forming bacterium, with type strain B5T(=DSM 44703T =CIP 107928T).

References

Further reading

External links
LPSN
Type strain of Pseudonocardia benzenivorans at BacDive -  the Bacterial Diversity Metadatabase

Pseudonocardia
Bacteria described in 2004